Indirana leithii (Leith's leaping frog, Leith's frog, Boulenger's brown frog, Matheran leaping frog, or Matheran Indian frog) is a species of frog in the family Ranixalidae. It is endemic to the northern Western Ghats of India. As currently defined, its range is restricted to the states of Maharashtra and southern Gujarat; earlier records elsewhere refer to other species.

Etymology
The specific name leithii honours Andrew Henderson Leith, a physician who worked as Sanitary Commissioner in Bombay.

Description
Adult males measure  and adult females  in snout–vent length. The tympanum is two-thirds of the eye diameter; a strong supra-tympanic fold runs from the eye to the shoulder. The fingers and toes bear enlarged discs; the toes are two-thirds webbed. Dorsal skin is rough with number of folds. Colouration is brownish with many, closely set black spots. The limbs are cross-barred. The venter is white while the throat is finely mottled with brown.

The following description is adopted from George Albert Boulenger's "Fauna of British India":
Vomerine teeth in two oblique groups are set just behind the level of the choanae. A free, pointed papilla sits on the middle of the tongue. The head is moderate; the snout is obtuse, with obtuse canthus rostralis and concave loreal region; the nostril is nearer to the end of the snout than to the eye; the interorbital space is a little narrower than the upper eyelid; the tympanum is distinct, two thirds the diameter of the eye. The fingers are moderate, the first extending not quite as for as second; the toes are two-thirds webbed, the web reaching the disks of the third and fifth toes; tips of fingers and toes dilated into small but well-developed disks; subarticular tubercles moderate; a single, small, oval inner metatarsal tubercle; no tarsal fold is present. The tibio-tarsal articulation reaches halfway between the eye and the end of the snout. The skin of the back has small scattered longitudinal warts; a strong fold runs from the eye to the shoulder. It is brown above, with small dark spots; limbs with dark transverse bands; lower parts white, throat mottled with brown. From snout to vent 1.25 inches.

Habitat
Indirana leithii is a terrestrial species associated with leaf-litter of moist, tropical, semi-evergreen forest, including degraded forests. Breeding takes place on wet rocks. The tadpoles can be found on moist surfaces next to streams.

This species was included as "vulnerable" in the IUCN Red List of Threatened Species in 2004. It is primarily threatened by the conversion of forested land to intensive agricultural use, but also by harvesting of wood for subsistence, road construction, and tourism are threats.

References

leithii
Frogs of India
Endemic fauna of the Western Ghats
Amphibians described in 1888
Taxa named by George Albert Boulenger